New Coke was the unofficial name of a reformulation of the soft drink Coca-Cola, introduced by The Coca-Cola Company in April 1985. It was renamed Coke II in 1990 and discontinued in July 2002. 

By 1985, Coca-Cola had been losing market share to diet soft drinks and non-cola beverages for several years. Blind taste tests suggested that consumers preferred the sweeter taste of the competing product Pepsi, and so the Coca-Cola recipe was reformulated. The American public reacted negatively, and New Coke was considered a major failure.

The company reintroduced the original Coke formula within three months, rebranded "Coca-Cola Classic", resulting in a significant sales boost. This led to speculation that the New Coke formula was a ploy to stimulate sales of the original Coca-Cola, which the company has denied. The story of New Coke remains influential as a cautionary tale against tampering with an established successful brand.

Background
After World War II, Coca-Cola held 60 percent of the market share for cola. By 1983, it had declined to under 24 percent, largely because of competition from Pepsi. Pepsi had begun to outsell Coke in supermarkets; Coke maintained its lead only through venues such as soda vending machines and fast food restaurants.

Market analysts believed baby boomers were more likely to purchase diet drinks as they aged and remained health- and weight-conscious. Growth in the full-calorie segment would come from younger drinkers, who at that time favored Pepsi by increasing margins. Meanwhile, the overall market for colas steadily declined in the early 1980s, as consumers increasingly purchased diet and non-cola soft drinks, many of which sold by Coca-Cola; this further eroded Coca-Cola's market share. When Roberto Goizueta became Coca-Cola CEO in 1980, he told employees there would be no "sacred cows" in how the company did business, including how it formulated its drinks.

Development
Coca-Cola's senior executives commissioned a secret project headed by marketing vice president Sergio Zyman and Coca-Cola USA president Brian Dyson to create a new flavor for Coke. This project was named "Project Kansas", from a photo of Kansas journalist William Allen White drinking a Coke; the image had been used extensively in Coca-Cola advertising and hung on several executives' walls.

The sweeter cola overwhelmingly beat both regular Coke and Pepsi in taste tests, surveys, and focus groups. The southeastern United States, one of Coca-Cola's strongest and most reliable markets, narrowly preferred the new flavor; this preference widened once the testers revealed the new taste was also a Coca-Cola product. One bottling company threatened to sue the company if it did not put the drink on the market.

Asked if they would buy and drink the product if it were Coca-Cola, most testers said they would, although said it would take some getting used to. About 10–12 percent of testers felt angry and alienated at the thought, and said they might stop drinking Coke. Their presence in focus groups tended to negatively skew results as they exerted indirect peer pressure on other participants.

The surveys, which were given more significance by standard marketing procedures of the era, were less negative than the taste tests and were key in convincing management to change the formula in 1985, to coincide with the drink's centenary. However, the groups had provided a clue as to how the change would play out in the public, a finding the company downplayed.

Management rejected an idea to make and sell the new flavor as a separate variety of Coca-Cola. The company's bottlers were already complaining about absorbing other recent additions into the product line since 1982, after the introduction of Diet Coke; Cherry Coke was launched nationally nearly concurrently with New Coke during 1985. Many bottling companies had sued over the company's syrup pricing policies. A new variety of Coke in competition with the main variety could also have cannibalized Coke's sales and increased the proportion of Pepsi drinkers relative to Coke drinkers.

Early in his career with Coca-Cola, Goizueta had been in charge of the Bahamas subsidiary. He had improved sales by tweaking the drink's flavor slightly, and so was receptive to the idea that changing the flavor of Coke could boost profits. He believed it would be "New Coke or no Coke", and that the change must take place openly. He insisted that the containers carry the "New!" label, which gave the drink its popular name.

Goizueta also made a visit to his mentor and predecessor as the company's chief executive, the ailing Robert W. Woodruff, who had built Coke into an international brand following World War II. Goizueta claimed he had secured Woodruff's blessing for the reformulation, but many of Goizueta's closest friends within the company doubted that Woodruff understood Goizueta's intentions. Woodruff died in March 1985, a month before New Coke was launched.

Launch
New Coke was introduced on April 23, 1985. Production of the original formulation ended later that week. In many areas, New Coke was initially introduced in "old" Coke packaging; bottlers used up remaining cans, cartons and labels before new packaging was widely available. Old cans containing New Coke were identified by their gold colored tops, while glass and plastic bottles had red caps instead of silver and white, respectively. Bright yellow stickers indicating the change were placed on the cartons of multi-packs.

The press conference at New York City's Lincoln Center to introduce the new formula did not go well. Reporters had already been fed questions by Pepsi, which was worried that New Coke would erase its gains. Goizueta, Coca-Cola's CEO, described the new flavor as "bolder", "rounder", and "more harmonious", and defended the change by saying that the drink's secret formula was not sacrosanct and inviolable. As far back as 1935, Coca-Cola sought kosher certification from Atlanta rabbi Tobias Geffen, and made two changes to the formula so the drink could be considered kosher (as well as halal and vegetarian). Goizueta also refused to admit that taste tests had led the change, calling it "one of the easiest decisions we've ever made". A reporter asked whether Diet Coke would also be reformulated "assuming [New Coke] is a success," to which Goizueta curtly replied, "No. And I didn't assume that this is a success. This is a success."

The emphasis on the new formula's sweeter taste also ran contrary to previous Coke advertising, in which spokesman Bill Cosby had touted the original Coke's less-sweet taste as a reason to prefer it over the sweeter taste of  Pepsi. The company's stock went up after the announcement, and market research showed 80 percent of the American public was aware of the change within days.

Initial success
Coca-Cola introduced the new formula with marketing pushes in New York, where workers renovating the Statue of Liberty for its 1986 centenary were given cans, and Washington, D.C., where thousands of cans were given away in Lafayette Park. As soon as New Coke was introduced, the new formula was available at McDonald's and other drink fountains in the United States. Sales figures from those cities, and other areas where it had been introduced such as Miami and Detroit, showed a reaction that went as the market research had predicted. In fact, Coke's sales were up 8 percent over the same period as the year before.

Most Coke drinkers resumed buying the new Coke at much the same level as they had the old one. Surveys indicated that the majority of regular Coke drinkers liked the new flavoring. Three quarters of the respondents said they would buy New Coke again. The big test, however, remained in the South, where Coke had first been tasted and bottled.

Backlash

Though New Coke was accepted by many Coca-Cola drinkers, many more resented the change, as had happened in the focus groups. Many critics were from the southern US states, some of whom considered Coca-Cola part of their regional identity. Some viewed the change through the prism of the Civil War as a surrender to the "Yankees" as PepsiCo, the manufacturer of Pepsi, is based in Purchase, New York.

In a Chicago Tribune story about reaction in the South, a professor at the University of Mississippi observed that "changing Coca-Cola is an intrusion on tradition" and thus would not be well received in that region. An Alabama resident wondered why the company had introduced the new flavor in New York; elsewhere in the state an Anniston Star columnist, noting Goizueta's Cuban origins, insinuated that the flavor change was a Communist plot. The Atlanta Journal-Constitution found a majority of patrons at The Varsity, a popular local restaurant in that city, favored the old formula. "Why didn't they test anybody here?" the co-owner asked. 

The company received over 40,000 calls and letters expressing anger or disappointment, including one letter, delivered to Goizueta, addressed to "Chief Dodo, the Coca-Cola Company". Another letter asked for his autograph, as the signature of "one of the dumbest executives in American business history" would likely become valuable in the future. The company hotline, 1-800-GET-COKE, received over 1,500 calls a day compared to around 400 before the change. A psychiatrist whom Coke had hired to listen in on calls told executives that some people sounded as if they were discussing the death of a family member.

There were critics from outside the region. Tribune columnist Bob Greene wrote some widely reprinted pieces ridiculing the new flavor and expressing anger at Coke's executives for having changed it. Comedians and talk show hosts, including Johnny Carson and David Letterman, made regular jokes mocking the switch. Ads for New Coke were booed heavily when they appeared on the scoreboard at the Houston Astrodome. Even Fidel Castro, a longtime Coca-Cola drinker, contributed to the backlash, calling New Coke a sign of American capitalist decadence. Goizueta's father expressed similar misgivings to his son, who later recalled that it was the only time his father had agreed with Castro, whose rule he had fled Cuba to avoid.

Gay Mullins, a Seattle retiree looking to start a public relations firm with $120,000 of borrowed money, formed the Old Cola Drinkers of America on May 28 to lobby Coca-Cola to either reintroduce the old formula or sell it to someone else. His organization eventually received over 60,000 phone calls. He also filed a class action lawsuit against the company (which was quickly dismissed by a judge who said he preferred the taste of Pepsi), while nevertheless expressing interest in securing the Coca-Cola Company as a client of his new firm should it reintroduce the old formula. In two informal blind taste tests, Mullins either failed to distinguish New Coke from old or expressed a preference for New Coke.

Despite ongoing resistance in the South, New Coke continued to do well in the rest of the country. However, the executives were uncertain of how international markets would react. They met with international Coke bottlers in Monaco; to their surprise, the bottlers were not interested in selling New Coke. Zyman also heard doubts and skepticism from his relatives in Mexico, where New Coke was scheduled to be introduced later that summer, when he went there on vacation.

Goizueta stated that Coca-Cola employees who liked New Coke felt unable to speak up due to peer pressure, as had happened in the focus groups. Donald Keough, the Coca-Cola president and chief operating officer at the time, reported overhearing someone say at his country club that they liked New Coke, but they would be "damned if I'll let Coca-Cola know that".

Response by PepsiCo
PepsiCo took advantage of the situation, running ads in which a first-time Pepsi drinker exclaimed, "Now I know why Coke did it!" Even amidst consumer anger and several Pepsi ads mocking Coca-Cola's debacle, Pepsi actually gained very few long-term converts over Coke's switch, despite a 14 percent sales increase over the same month the previous year, the largest sales growth in the company's history. Coca-Cola's director of corporate communications, Carlton Curtis, realized over time that consumers were more upset about the withdrawal of the old formula than the taste of the new one.

Roger Enrico, then director of PepsiCo's North American operations, declared a company-wide holiday and took out a full-page ad in The New York Times proclaiming that PepsiCo had won the long-running "Cola Wars".  Since Coke officials were preoccupied over the weekend with preparations for the announcement, their PepsiCo counterparts had time to cultivate skepticism among reporters, sounding themes that would later come into play in the public discourse over the changed drink. After the announcement on April 23, PepsiCo gave its employees the day off saying, "By today's action, Coke has admitted that it's not the real thing."

Company dissatisfaction
Some Coca-Cola executives had quietly been arguing for a reintroduction of the old formula as early as May. By mid-June, when soft drink sales usually start to rise, the numbers showed that new Coke was leveling among consumers. Executives feared social peer pressure was now affecting their bottom line. Some consumers even began trying to obtain "old" Coke from overseas, where the new formula had not yet been introduced, as domestic stocks of the old drink were exhausted. Over the course of the month, Coca-Cola's chemists also quietly reduced the acidity level of the new formula, hoping to assuage complaints about the flavor and allow its sweetness to be better perceived (advertisements pointing to this change were prepared, but never used).

In addition to the noisier public protests, boycotts, and bottles being emptied into the streets of several cities, the company had more serious reasons to be concerned. Its bottlers, and not just the ones still suing the company over syrup pricing policies, were expressing concern. While they had given Goizueta a standing ovation when he announced the change at an April 22 bottlers' meeting at Atlanta's Woodruff Arts Center, glad the company had finally taken some initiative in the face of PepsiCo's advances, they were less enthusiastic about the taste.  Most of them saw great difficulty having to promote and sell a drink that had long been marketed as "The Real Thing", constant and unchanging, now that it had been changed.

The 20 bottlers still suing Coca-Cola made much of the change in their legal arguments. Coca-Cola had argued in its defense when the suit was originally filed that the formula's uniqueness and difference from Diet Coke justified different pricing policies from the latter – but if the new formula was simply an HFCS-sweetened Diet Coke, Coca-Cola could not argue the formula was unique. Bottlers, particularly in the South, were also tired of facing personal opprobrium over the change. Many reported that some acquaintances and even friends and relatives had ostracized them, or had expressed displeasure in other emotionally hurtful ways. On June 23, several of the bottlers took these complaints to Coca-Cola executives in a private meeting. With the company now fearing boycotts not only from its consumers but its bottlers, talks about reintroducing the old formula moved from "if" to "when".

Finally, the Coca-Cola board decided that enough was enough, and plans were set in motion to bring back the old Coke. Company president Donald Keough revealed years later, in the documentary The People vs. Coke (2002), that they realized this was the only right thing to do when they visited a small restaurant in Monaco and the owner proudly said they served "the real thing, it's a real Coke", offering them a chilled  oz. glass bottle of original Coca-Cola.

Reversal
On the afternoon of July 11, 1985, Coca-Cola executives announced the return of the original formula, 79 days after New Coke's introduction. ABC News' Peter Jennings interrupted General Hospital with a special bulletin to share the news with viewers. On the floor of the U.S. Senate, David Pryor called the reintroduction "a meaningful moment in U.S. history". The company hotline received 31,600 calls in the two days after the announcement.

The new product continued to be marketed and sold as Coke (until 1992, when it was renamed Coke II) while the original formula was named Coca-Cola Classic, and for a short time it was referred to by the public as Old Coke. Some who tasted the reintroduced formula were not convinced that the first batches really were the same formula that had supposedly been retired that spring. This was true for a few regions, because Coca-Cola Classic differed from the original formula in that all bottlers who had not already done so were using high fructose corn syrup (HFCS) instead of cane sugar to sweeten the drink, though most had by this time.

"There is a twist to this story which will please every humanist and will probably keep Harvard professors puzzled for years," said Keough at a press conference. "The simple fact is that all the time and money and skill poured into consumer research on the new Coca-Cola could not measure or reveal the deep and abiding emotional attachment to original Coca-Cola felt by so many people."

Gay Mullins, founder of the organization Old Cola Drinkers of America (which had lobbied Coca-Cola to either reintroduce the old formula or sell it to someone else), was given the first case of Coca-Cola Classic. Later he complained that the drink now made him sick, which he blamed on the drink's use of HFCS; he also claimed that HFCS had dulled his taste buds, accounting for his preference for New Coke in taste tests.

Aftermath and legacy
By the end of 1985, Coca-Cola Classic was substantially outselling both New Coke and Pepsi. Six months after the rollout, Coke's sales had increased at more than twice the rate of Pepsi's.

New Coke's sales dwindled to a three percent share of the market, although it was selling quite well in Los Angeles and some other key markets. Later research, however, suggested that it was not the return of Coca-Cola Classic, but instead the nearly unnoticed  introduction of Cherry Coke, which appeared almost simultaneously with  New Coke, that can be credited with the company's success in 1985.

The Coca-Cola Company spent a considerable amount of time trying to figure out where it had made a mistake, ultimately concluding that it had underestimated the public reaction of the portion of the customer base that would be alienated by the switch. This would not emerge for several years afterward, however, and in the meantime the public simply concluded that the company had, as Keough suggested, failed to consider the public's attachment to the idea of what Coke's old formula represented. While that has become conventional wisdom in the ensuing years, some analyses have suggested otherwise.

This populist version of the story served Coke's interests, however, as the episode did more to position and define Coca-Cola as a brand embodying values distinct from Pepsi. Allowing itself to be portrayed as a somewhat clueless large corporation forced to withdraw from a big change by overwhelming public pressure flattered customers, as Keough put it, "We love any retreat which has us rushing toward our best customers with the product they love the most." Bottles and cans continued to bear the "Coca-Cola Classic" title until January 2009, when the company announced it would stop printing the word "Classic" on the labels of  bottles sold in parts of the southeastern United States. The change was part of a larger strategy to rejuvenate the product's image.

Bill Cosby ended his long-time advertising for Coca-Cola, claiming that his commercials praising the superiority of the new formula had hurt his credibility. No one at Coca-Cola was fired for the change. When Goizueta died in 1997, the company's share price was well above what it was when he had taken over 16 years earlier and its position as market leader even more firmly established. At the time, Roger Enrico, then head of PepsiCo's American operations, likened New Coke to the Edsel. Later, when he became PepsiCo's CEO, he modified his assessment of the situation, saying that had people been fired or demoted over New Coke, it would have sent a message that risk-taking was strongly discouraged at the company.

In the late 1990s, Zyman summed up the New Coke experience thus:

New Coke continued to do what it had originally been designed to do: win taste tests. In 1987, The Wall Street Journal surveyed 100 randomly selected cola drinkers, the majority of whom indicated a preference for Pepsi, with Classic Coke accounting for the remainder save two New Coke loyalists. When this group was given a chance to try all three in a blind test, New Coke slightly edged out Pepsi, but many drinkers reacted angrily to finding they had chosen a brand other than their favorite.

Goizueta claimed that he never once regretted the decision to change Coca-Cola. He even threw a tenth anniversary party for New Coke in 1995 and continued to drink it until his death in 1997.

After Coca-Cola Classic

In the short run, the reintroduction of original Coca-Cola saved Coke's sales figures and brought it back in the good graces of many customers and bottlers. Phone calls and letters to the company were as joyful and thankful as they had been angry and depressed. "You would have thought we'd cured cancer," said one executive.

But confusion reigned at the company's marketing department, which had to design a plan to market two Coca-Colas where such plans were inconceivable just a few months before. Coca-Cola Classic did not need much help, with a "Red, White and You" campaign showcasing the American virtues many of those who had clamored for its reintroduction had pointedly reminded the company that it embodied. But the company was at a loss to sell what was now just "Coke". Obviously, "The Best Just Got Better" could no longer be used. Marketers fumbled for a strategy for the rest of the year. Matters were not helped when McDonald's announced shortly after the reintroduction of Coca-Cola Classic, that it was immediately switching from New Coke back to original Coca-Cola at all of its restaurants.

 At the beginning of 1986, however, Coke's marketing team found a strategy by returning to one of their original motives for changing the formula: the youth market that preferred Pepsi. Max Headroom, the purportedly computer-generated media personality played by Matt Frewer, was chosen to replace Cosby as the spokesman for Coke's new "Catch the wave" campaign. With his slicked-back hair and sunglasses, he was already known to much of the U.S. youth audience through appearances on MTV and Cinemax. The campaign was launched with a television commercial produced by McCann Erickson New York, with Max saying in his trademark stutter, "C-c-c-catch the wave!" and referring to his fellow "Cokeologists". In a riposte to Pepsi's televisual teasings, one showed Headroom asking a Pepsi can he was "interviewing" how it felt about more drinkers preferring Coke to it and then cut to the condensation forming on, and running down, the can. "S-s-s-s-sweating?" he asked.

The campaign was a huge success, and surveys likewise showed that more than three-quarters of the target market were aware of the ads within two days. Coke's consumer hotline received more calls about Max than any previous spokesperson, some even asking if he had a girlfriend. The ads and campaign continued through 1987, and were chosen as best of 1986 by Video Storyboard of New York.

Coke II
In 1985, New Coke was sold only in the United States, United States territories, and Canada while the original formula continued to be sold in the rest of the world. New Coke was eventually returned to the company's product portfolio; it was test-marketed in certain U.S. cities under the name Coke II in 1990, which was taken national in late 1992, despite the company's original intention not to create a second brand. Filmmaker Miranda July suggested the name of Coke II while working as a tastemaker for an ad agency.

The Coca-Cola Company did practically nothing to promote or otherwise distinguish it. In a market already offering several choices of drinks calling themselves "Coke" in some fashion or another, the public saw little reason to embrace a product they had firmly rejected seven years earlier, and within about a year, Coke II was largely off the American shelves again. By 1998, it could only be found in a few scattered markets in the Northwest, Midwest and some overseas territories. In July 2002, Coca-Cola announced that Coke II would be discontinued entirely.

On August 16, 2002, the Coca-Cola Company announced a change of the label of Coke Classic in which the word "Classic" was no longer so prominent, leading to speculation that it would eventually be removed and the last traces of New Coke eliminated. In 2009, Coca-Cola permanently removed "Classic" from its North American packaging.

Commercial legacy
"For a product so widely despised," noted AdWeek blogger Tim Nudd in 2006, "New Coke (a.k.a. Coke II) still gets an admirable amount of ink." He noted Blink: The Power of Thinking Without Thinking (2005) by Malcolm Gladwell, and Why Most Things Fail: Evolution, Extinction and Economics (2005) by Paul Ormerod, that dealt with it at some length, as well as two recent mentions in Forbes and Sports Illustrated.

Within Coca-Cola, the role the company's bottlers had played in forcing its hand led executives to create a new subsidiary, Coca-Cola Enterprises, which bought out several of the larger bottlers and placed distribution and marketing efforts more tightly under Coca-Cola's control.

Conspiracy theories

The Coca-Cola Company's apparently sudden reversal on New Coke led to conspiracy theories, including:

 The company intentionally changed the formula, hoping consumers would be upset with the company, and demand the original formula to return, which in turn would cause sales to spike. Keough, the company president, answered this speculation by saying "We're not that dumb, and we're not that smart."
 The putative switch was planned all along to cover the change from sugar-sweetened Coke to much less expensive HFCS, a theory that was supposedly given credence by the apparently different taste of Coke Classic when it first hit the market (the U.S. sugar trade association took out a full-page ad lambasting Coke for using HFCS in all bottling of the old formula when it was reintroduced). In fact, Coca-Cola began allowing bottlers to remove up to half of the product's cane sugar as early as 1980, five years before the introduction of New Coke.  By the time the new formula was introduced, most bottlers had already sweetened Coca-Cola entirely with HFCS.
 It provided cover for the final removal of all coca derivatives from the product to placate the Drug Enforcement Administration, which was trying to eradicate the plant worldwide to combat an increase in cocaine trafficking and consumption. While Coke's executives were indeed relieved the new formula contained no coca and concerned about the long-term future of the Peruvian government-owned coca fields that supplied it in the face of increasing DEA pressure to end cultivation of the crop, according to author Mark Pendergrast there was no direct pressure from the DEA on Coca-Cola to do so.  This theory was endorsed in a Time article, as well as by historian Bartow Elmore, who claims the reformulation was made in response to the escalating War on Drugs by the Reagan Administration.

Taste test problems
In his book Blink: The Power of Thinking Without Thinking (2005), Malcolm Gladwell relates his conversations with market researchers in the food industry who put most of the blame for the failure of New Coke on the flawed nature of taste tests. They claim most are subject to systematic biases. Tests such as the Pepsi Challenge were "sip tests", meaning that drinkers were given small samples (less than a can or bottle's worth) to try. Gladwell contends that what people say they like in these tests may not reflect what they actually buy to drink at home over several days. Carol Dollard, who once worked in product development for PepsiCo, told Gladwell: "I've seen many times where the sip test will give you one result and the home-use test will give you the exact opposite." For example, although many consumers react positively to the sweeter taste of Pepsi in small volumes, it may become unattractively sweet when drunk in quantity. A more comprehensive testing regimen could possibly have revealed this, Gladwell's sources believe.

Gladwell reports that other market researchers have criticized Coke for not realizing that much of its success as a brand came from what they call sensation transference, a phenomenon first described by marketer Louis Cheskin in the late 1940s: tasters unconsciously add their reactions to the drink's packaging into their assessment of the taste. For example, one of the researchers told Gladwell that his firm's research found 7-Up drinkers believed a sample from a bottle with a more yellow label was more "lemony", although the flavor was identical. In Coke's case, it is alleged that buyers, subject to sensation transference, were also "tasting" the red color of the container and distinctive Coca-Cola script. It was therefore, in their opinion, a mistake to focus solely on the product and its taste. "The mistake Coke made was in attributing their loss in share entirely to the product." said Darrel Rhea, an executive with the firm Cheskin founded. He points to PepsiCo's work in establishing a youth-oriented brand identity from the 1960s as having more bearing on its success.

Coke considered but rejected gradually changing the drink's flavor incrementally, without announcing they were doing so. Executives feared the public would notice and exaggerate slight differences in taste. In 1998, Joel Dubow, a professor of food marketing at St. Joseph's University, tested this "flavor balance hypothesis" and argued that it was not true. He and fellow researcher Nancy Childs tested mixtures of Coca-Cola Classic and Coke II and found that the gradual changes of taste were not noticed by a significant number of tasters. Coke, he said, would have succeeded had it chosen this strategy.

2019 comeback
On May 21, 2019, Coca-Cola announced that the 1985 reformulation (once again bearing the name "New Coke") would be reintroduced in limited quantities to promote the third season of the Netflix series Stranger Things. The show, set in 1985, included cans of New Coke in three of the season's episodes.

About 500,000 cans of New Coke were produced for the promotion, to be sold mostly online. So many people were eager to buy it, however, that the volume of orders crashed the Coca-Cola website. Many fans complained because they wanted to order some, and the company apologized for the delays on social media platforms. It was also available in select vending machines in cities such as New York and Los Angeles.

The reintroduced drink got friendlier reviews than it had in 1985. A writer at BuzzFeed said it was "nice and refreshing", lacking the lingering aftertaste of Classic Coke. "I would take this over other colas," said a colleague. Food & Wine staffers also had favorable impressions: "sweeter and smoother than regular Coke", "almost syrupy in a pleasant way", although an older one who recalled the original rollout said it had not improved for them.

Tim Murphy, a reporter for the progressive magazine Mother Jones, suggested that, in ultimately overcoming an initial resistance that he saw as reactionary, New Coke had won the war after losing the battle. "Soft-drink trends have also proven Coke right about a willingness to adapt to new tastes: A majority of Coke sales today are non-Classic products, such as Diet and Coke Zero," he wrote. This explained the favorable response from tasters. "It tasted weird then; it tastes like what's normal now."

See also

 List of defunct consumer brands
 List of Coca-Cola brands

Other soft drink failures
 Crystal Pepsi, early 1990s failure for that company that is occasionally reintroduced for limited periods
 Dasani, bottled water brand produced by Coca-Cola that failed in the United Kingdom despite huge marketing push
 MagiCan, failed Coca-Cola promotion in 1990
 OK Soda, Coca-Cola brand intended to appeal to Generation X drinkers in early 1990s known for its counterintuitive marketing, managed by Sergio Zyman

References

Further reading

External links
  With a good talk on the problems of their research methodologies (focus groups v. surveys).
 
 
 
 

Coca-Cola brands
Products introduced in 1985
Conspiracy theories in the United States
Discontinued soft drinks
Food and drink introduced in the 1980s
Caffeinated soft drinks
Products and services discontinued in 2002